The Seychelles giant millipede (Sechelleptus seychellarum), is a species of millipede endemic to Seychelles.

References

Spirostreptida
Animals described in 1834
Millipedes of Africa
Arthropods of Seychelles
Endemic fauna of Seychelles
Taxa named by Julien Desjardins